Bayerisches Volksecho ('Bavarian People's Echo') was a German language daily newspaper, published from Munich, West Germany between June 1951 to August 17, 1956. Bayerisches Volksecho was the regional organ of the Communist Party of Germany in Bavaria. As of 1955, the newspaper had a daily circulation of around 50,000. Bayerisches Volksecho was banned along with the Communist Party in 1956.

References

1951 establishments in West Germany
1956 disestablishments in West Germany
Communist newspapers
Communist Party of Germany
Defunct newspapers published in Germany
German-language communist newspapers
Newspapers published in Munich
Daily newspapers published in Germany
Publications established in 1951
Publications disestablished in 1956